Frederick Primrose Whitman (9 March 1896 – 21 December 1974) was a Liberal party member of the House of Commons of Canada. He was born in Lawrencetown, Nova Scotia and became a salesman by career.

Whitman was educated in the public and secondary schools of Lawrencetown, then attended the University of Alberta where he received a Bachelor of Science degree. During his military service in World War I, he attained the rank of lieutenant.

He was first elected to Parliament at the Mount Royal riding in the 1940 general election then re-elected there in 1945. For the 1949 election, Whitman sought re-election at the new Notre-Dame-de-Grâce riding and won the seat there, but was defeated in the next election in 1953 by William McLean Hamilton of the Progressive Conservative party.

References

External links
 

1896 births
1974 deaths
Canadian military personnel of World War I
Liberal Party of Canada MPs
Members of the House of Commons of Canada from Quebec
University of Alberta alumni